David A. Epp  (born June 10, 1962) is a Canadian politician who was elected to represent the riding of Chatham-Kent—Leamington in the House of Commons of Canada in the 2019 Canadian federal election. He is a farmer in Leamington, Ontario.

Electoral record

References

External links

Living people
Conservative Party of Canada MPs
Members of the House of Commons of Canada from Ontario
Year of birth uncertain
Farmers from Ontario
People from Leamington, Ontario
1962 births